The 2013–14 UConn Huskies men's basketball team represented the University of Connecticut in the 2013–2014 NCAA Division I basketball season. The Huskies were led by second-year head coach Kevin Ollie. The Huskies split their home games between the XL Center in Hartford, Connecticut, and the Harry A. Gampel Pavilion on the UConn campus in Storrs, Connecticut. The Huskies were members of the American Athletic Conference. One year after being banned from postseason play for sanctions, the Huskies returned to the Final Four, where they defeated the Florida Gators in the national semifinal round and the Kentucky Wildcats in the 2014 National Championship Game. Shabazz Napier was named the tournament's MOP. The next day, the UConn Huskies women's team won the women's NCAA basketball tournament, only the second time that a school has won both the men's and women's Division I national basketball championships in the same year; UConn first accomplished this in 2004.

Previous season
The Huskies finished the 2012–13 season with a record of 20-10 overall, including 10–8 in Big East play. However, due to sanctions resulting in penalties stemming from years of very poor APR ratings, the Huskies were ineligible for all the postseason tournaments, including the 2013 Big East men's basketball tournament, the NCAA tournament and the NIT.

Preseason outlook
The Huskies were selected to finish 2nd in their new conference, the American Athletic Conference (AAC). Coach Kevin Ollie would serve his second season with key players Shabazz Napier, Ryan Boatright, DeAndre Daniels, and Omar Calhoun returned. The Huskies were ranked 17th in the preseason AP poll.

Departures

Roster

Schedule 

|-
!colspan=12 style="background:#002868; color:white;"| Exhibition

|- 
!colspan=12 style="background:#002868; color:white;"| Regular Season

|-
!colspan=12 style="background:#002868;"| AAC Tournament

 
 
|-
!colspan=12 style="background:#002868;"| NCAA tournament

Rankings

References 

UConn Huskies men's basketball seasons
Connecticut
Connecticut
NCAA Division I men's basketball tournament Final Four seasons
NCAA Division I men's basketball tournament championship seasons
2013 in sports in Connecticut
2014 in sports in Connecticut